The 1996–97 Iraqi Premier League was the 23rd season of the competition since its foundation in 1974. The name of the league was changed from Iraqi Advanced Clubs League to Iraqi Premier League. The league title was won by Al-Quwa Al-Jawiya for the fourth time. They also won the Iraq FA Cup, the Iraqi Elite Cup and the Iraqi Super Cup in this season, completing the first ever domestic quadruple in Iraqi football history.

League table

Results

Season statistics

Top scorers

Hat-tricks

Notes
6 Player scored 6 goals

References

External links
 Iraq Football Association

Iraqi Premier League seasons
1996–97 in Iraqi football
Iraq